Ward Blanton  is an American scholar. He is known for his research on biblical studies and philosophy of religion.

Ward Blanton studied at Yale University where he earned his Ph.D. with the dissertation Apocalyptic transmissions: images of early Christianity in the construction of modern critical identity in 2004 under the supervision of Dale Martin. He is also the supervisor of Fatima Tofighi's Ph.

Books
 An Insurrectionist Manifesto: Four New Gospels for a Radical Politics, with Clayton Crockett, Jeffrey W. Robbins, and Noëlle Vahanian, Columbia University Press, 2016
 A Materialism for the Masses: Saint Paul and the Philosophy of Undying Life, Columbia University Press, 2014
 Displacing Christian Origins: Philosophy, Secularity, and the New Testament, University of Chicago Press, 2007 
 Paul and the Philosophers, edited with Hent de Vries, Fordham University Press, 2013

References

Living people
Academics of the University of Kent
Philosophers of religion
Religious studies scholars
Yale University alumni
Year of birth missing (living people)